Tricuspidalestes caeruleus is a species of African tetra endemic to the Democratic Republic of Congo.  It is the only member of its genus.

References
 

Alestidae
Monotypic fish genera
Fish of Africa
Endemic fauna of the Democratic Republic of the Congo
Taxa named by Hubert Matthes
Fish described in 1964